Escaped plants are cultivated plants, usually garden plants, that are not originally native to an area, and due to their dispersal strategies, have escaped from cultivation and have settled in the wild and bred there, whether intentionally or unintentionally. Escaped plants are purposefully introduced plants that have naturalized in the wild and can develop into invasive plants, the settlement of which is to be assessed as problematic. Other commonly used terms include escaped garden plant, garden escapee, escaped ornamental or garden refugee.

Some plants are valued as ornamental plants since they are very adaptable and easy to grow, and therefore would escape cultivation and become weedy in various ecosystems with far-reaching ecological and economic consequences. They can also develop into invasive intruders, especially in fragile or unstable ecosystems. Occasionally, their spread can even be traced back to botanical gardens. Therefore, escaped plants are the subject of research in invasion biology. Some plants escaped from cultivation so long ago that they are currently considered roadside plants or wildflowers.

Dispersal
 
All garden refugees belong to the so-called hemerochoric plants. This term is used across the board for plants that have been introduced directly or indirectly by humans. The term also includes the unintentionally introduced plants that were introduced through seed pollution (speirochoric) or through unintentional transport (agochoric). 

Plants escape from gardens in many ways, but one main cause of spread from the ornamental garden is by green waste dumping in bushland and road reserves and as well as by birds or other animals eating the fruits or seeds and dispersing them. Others are accidental hitchhikers that escape on ships, vehicles, and equipment. Garden escapees can be adventive, which means they can be established in an inappropriate area of origin site by human influence. 

Occasionally, seed contamination also introduces new plants that could reproduce for a short period of time. The proportion of adventitious species in open ruderal corridors at such locations can exceed 30% of the flora of these locations. Further, ornamental alien plants can easily escape their confined areas (such as gardens and greenhouses) and naturalize if the climate outside changes to their benefit. In the US, there are over 5,000 escaped plants, many of which are escaped ornamentals.

Ecological threats

Many invasive neophytes in Australia and New Zealand were originally garden escapees. The Jerusalem thorn forms in the Northern Territory impenetrable thorny thickets which can be several kilometers in length and width. Two other plants introduced as ornamental garden plants, Asparagus asparagoides and Chrysanthemoides monilifera, now dominate the herbaceous layer in many eucalyptus forests and supplant perennials, grasses, orchids, and lilies. 

Neophytes that develop aggressively, which displace and repel large areas of native species in many humid and shady landscapes, permanently change the biotope pose in many parts of the world, and sometimes create an economic problem. For example, species of Opuntia (prickly pears) have been introduced from America to Australia, and have become wild, thus rendering territories unsuitable for breeding; the same goes for European gorse (Ulex europaeus) in New Zealand.  

Rhododendron species introduced as ornamental garden plants in the British Isles crowd out island vegetation. The same can be seen in many acidic peatlands in the Atlantic and subatlantic climates. Robinia pseudoacacia was imported from America to Central Europe for its rapid growth, and it now threatens the scarce steppe and natural forest areas of the drylands. Examples in forests include Prunus serotina which was initially introduced to speed up the accumulation of humus. 

In North America, Tamarisk trees, native to southern Europe and temperate parts of Asia, have proven to be problematic plants. In nutrient-poor heaths, but rich in grasses and bushes (fynbos) in the region Cape in South Africa, species of eucalyptus from Australia are growing strongly. As they are largely accustomed to poor soils, and in the Cape region they lack competitors for nutrients and parasites that could regulate their population, they are able to greatly modify the biotope. In Hawaii, the epiphytic fern Phlebodium aureum has spread widely, and is considered an invasive plant.

Particularly unstable ecosystems, already unbalanced by attacks or possessing certain characteristics, can be massively damaged by neophytes because the final vegetation is already weakened. In the humid forests of Australia, neophytes first colonize along roads and paths and then enter the interior of the regions they surround.  

Thunbergia mysorensis, native to India, invaded the rainforests around the coastal city of Cairns in Queensland and even invades trees 40 m high. In Central Australia, the Eurasian species Tamarix aphylla grows along river banks, repelling native tree species, and wildlife that go together, lowers water levels and increases soil salinity. As in the United States, tamarisks have proven to be formidable bio-invaders. The fight against this species of trees, which has spread widely since, appears to be almost hopeless.

Related terms 
Garden escapees can fall within the definition of, and may have a relation to, these botanical terminologies below:

Agriophyte: Refers to plant species that have invaded natural or near-natural vegetation and can survive there without human intervention. Established in their new natural habitats, they remain part of natural vegetation even after human influence has ceased, and are independent of humans in their continued existence. Examples in Central Europe are waterweed, Douglas fir or Japanese knotweed, and the sweet chestnuts introduced by the Romans in Germany. The group of ornamental plants and even the poppy (both archaeophytes) that normally grow in fields colonized pioneering sites in floodplains and is therefore now part of natural vegetation.
Epecophyte: Species of recent appearance, usually numerous and constant in the country, but confined to artificial habitats, such as meadows and ruderal vegetation. They are dependent on humans for existence that their habitats require constant renewal.
Ephemerophyte: Species that are only introduced inconsistently, that die briefly from culture or that would disappear again without constant replenishment of seeds. In other words, they can establish themselves temporarily, but they are not in a position to meet all the conditions relating to the territory. A cold winter, or an unusual drought, can lead to the death of these plants; most of the time, they are not able to fight against the local flora in extreme conditions.
Hemerochory:  Plants or their seeds may have been transported voluntarily (introduction) or involuntarily by humans in a territory which they could not have colonized by their own natural mechanisms of dissemination, or at least much more slowly. They are able to maintain themselves in this new vital space without voluntary help from man. Many Central European cultivated and ornamental plants are hemorochoric – insofar as they have escaped and subsist independently of cultivation. These are the forms of hemerochory:
Agochoric: Plants that are spread through accidental transport with, among other things, ships, trains, and cars. On land, agochoric plants used to be common in harbors, at train stations, or along railway lines. Australia, like New Zealand, has taken stringent measures to prevent the spread by seed or human transport. Agricultural implements imported into Australia must be thoroughly cleaned. Air travelers from other continents are forced to thoroughly clean the soles of their shoes.
Ethelochoric: Deliberate introduction by seedlings, seeds, or plants in a new habitat by humans. Many cultivated plants which currently play an important role in human nutrition have been deliberately disseminated by humans. Wheat, barley, lentil, broad bean and flax, for example. 
Speirochoric: Unintentional introduction by seeds. As all seed samples also contain the seeds of the grasses of the field from which they were obtained, the trade-in seeds of useful plants has also allowed the spread of other species. Speirochoric plants are therefore sown on soil prepared by man and compete with useful plants. Wild chamomile, poppy, cornflower, corn buttercup are example of plants that were unintentionally scattered.

Example species
Examples of escaped plants and/or garden escapees include: 

 Alchemilla mollis
 Allium schoenoprasum  
 Allium ursinum
 Anredera cordifolia
 Aquilegia vulgaris  
 Araujia sericifera
 Ardisia crenata
 Asclepias tuberosa 
 Asparagus aethiopicus
 Baccharis halimifolia 
 Bartlettina sordida
 Berberis thunbergii
 Borago officinalis
 Bryophyllum delagoense
 Buddleja davidii
 Calystegia silvatica
 Cardiospermum halicacabum
 Carpobrotus edulis
 Castanea sativa
 Cenchrus setaceus
 Centranthus ruber
 Cestrum elegans
 Cestrum parqui
 Clematis orientalis
 Clerodendrum bungei
 Consolida ajacis   
 Convallaria majalis
 Coreopsis basalis
  Crocosmia spp.
 Cyclamen persicum 
 Cymbalaria muralis
 Dichondra repens
 Digitalis purpurea  
 Dolichandra unguis-cati
 Doronicum orientale
 Echinops exaltatus
 Elodea canadensis
 Epiphyllum oxypetalum
 Eriocapitella hupehensis
 Erythranthe moschata
 Eschscholzia californica  
 Foeniculum vulgare
 Galega officinalis
 Galinsoga parviflora
 Hedera helix
 Hedera hibernica
 Helianthus annuus
 Helianthus tuberosus
 Hemerocallis fulva
 Heracleum mantegazzianum
 Hesperis matronalis
 Ilex aquifolium
 Impatiens glandulifera
 Impatiens parviflora 
 Ipomoea cairica
 Iris pseudacorus
 Isatis tinctoria
 Juglans regia 
 Kalanchoe delagoensis
 Kniphofia uvaria
 Laburnum anagyroides
 Lamiastrum galeobdolon
 Lantana camara
 Lavandula stoechas
 Lespedeza bicolor
 Ligustrum lucidum
 Lilium lancifolium
 Linaria purpurea
 Lonicera maackii
 Lysimachia punctata
 Lythrum salicaria
 Macfadyena unguis-cati
 Melastoma sanguineum
 Monarda punctata  
 Nothoscordum gracile
 Nymphaea mexicana
 Olea europaea subsp. cuspidata
 Opuntia ficus-indica
 Oxalis debilis
 Papaver cambricum
 Pelargonium peltatum
 Phlox paniculata
 Physalis alkekengi
 Prunus serotina
 Reynoutria japonica
 Rhododendron ponticum
 Ribes rubrum
 Ricinus communis
 Robinia pseudoacacia
 Rubus hawaiensis
 Ruellia simplex
 Senecio angulatus
 Senecio elegans
 Senna pendula
 Silene armeria 
 Solanum lycopersicum
 Sparaxis tricolor
 Stachytarpheta mutabilis
 Talinum paniculatum
 Thymus praecox
 Tradescantia fluminensis
 Tulipa sylvestris
 Vanilla tahitensis
 Vinca major
 Vinca minor
 Watsonia meriana

Gallery

See also
Adventitious plant
Archaeophyte
Assisted colonization
Hemerochory
Neophyte

Bibliography
 Angelika Lüttig, Juliane Kasten (2003): Hagebutte & Co: Blüten, Früchte und Ausbreitung europäischer Pflanzen. Fauna, Nottuln. ISBN 3-93-598090-6.
 Christian Stolz (2013): Archäologische Zeigerpflanzen: Fallbeispiele aus dem Taunus und dem nördlichen Schleswig-Holstein. Plants as indicators for archaeological find sites: Case studies from the Taunus Mts. and from the northern part of Schleswig-Holstein (Germany). Schriften des Arbeitskreises Landes- und Volkskunde 11. 
 Herrando-Moraira, S., Nualart, N., Herrando-Moraira, A. et al. Climatic niche characteristics of native and invasive Lilium lancifolium. Sci Rep 9, 14334 (2019). Climatic niche characteristics of native and invasive Lilium lancifolium

References

External links
ESCAPED GARDEN PLANTS AS A KEY THREATENING PROCESS

Invasive species
Environmental conservation
Environmental terminology
Habitat